Cienfuegos is a city on the southern coast of Cuba.

Cienfuegos may also refer to:

Geography
Camilo Cienfuegos (Santa Cruz del Norte), a village in Cuba
Cienfuegos Bay
Cienfuegos Province, the province in which the city of Cienfuegos is located
Historic Centre of Cienfuegos

People with the surname
Camilo Cienfuegos, one of the Cuban Revolution's four major figures
Fr. José Ignacio Cienfuegos Arteaga, a Chilean priest, Roman Catholic bishop of Concepción and political figure. He served twice as President of the Senate of Chile
Mauricio Cienfuegos, a retired Salvadoran football player
Nicasio Álvarez de Cienfuegos, a Spanish poet and publicist
Salvador Cienfuegos Zepeda, a Mexican division general and Secretary of National Defense

Sport 
Cienfuegos (Cuban National Series), an amateur baseball team in the Cuban National Series
Cienfuegos (Cuban League baseball club), a defunct professional baseball team from the Cuban League
FC Cienfuegos, a football club in the Campeonato Nacional de Fútbol de Cuba

Other
Battle of Cienfuegos, a minor engagement of the Spanish–American War
Cienfuegos press, an Anarchist publishing house

Spanish-language surnames